Carapebus is a municipality located in the Brazilian state of Rio de Janeiro. Its population was 16,586 (2020) and its area is 306 km².

Carapebus Esporte Clube and Associação Atlética Carapebus are the municipality's football (soccer) clubs.

References

Populated coastal places in Rio de Janeiro (state)
Municipalities in Rio de Janeiro (state)